The Almanac is a weekly newspaper in the South Hills region of Pittsburgh and northern Washington County, Pennsylvania, USA. It is published by the Observer Publishing Company of Washington, Pennsylvania. It is delivered free of charge to most houses in its distribution area. Currently, the Almanac covers Mt. Lebanon, Peters Township, Bethel Park, Upper St. Clair, South Fayette and outlying areas.

History
The Almanac was established in 1967 to serve the South Hills of Pittsburgh. Observer Publishing Co. bought a controlling interest in The Advertiser and The Almanac in 1981. In 1990, the newspapers were converted from tabloid-size to broadsheet. The two newspapers merged into The Almanac in 1998.

External links
 Official website

Newspapers published in Pittsburgh
1967 establishments in Pennsylvania
Newspapers established in 1967